Jan Siemerink was the defending champion, but lost in the first round to Fabrice Santoro.

Yevgeny Kafelnikov won in the final 6–2, 7–6(7–3), against Tim Henman.

Seeds

Draw

Finals

Top half

Bottom half

Qualifying

Qualifying seeds

Qualifiers

Qualifying draws

First qualifier

Second qualifier

Third qualifier

Fourth qualifier

References

External links
 Official results archive (ATP)
 Official results archive (ITF)

Singles
1999 ATP Tour